Bella Hall Gauld (31 December 1878 – 21 August 1961) was a Canadian labour educator, political activist, and pianist.

Gauld was born in Lindsay, Ontario and raised on a farm in Manitoba. She joined the newly formed Workers Party of Canada, which was known after 1924 as the Communist Party of Canada. She and Annie Buller studied at the Rand School of Social Science in New York City before returning to Montreal and establishing the Montreal Labour College. When that organisation ended in 1924, Gauld helped form the Women's Labour League.

References

1878 births
1961 deaths
Members of the Communist Party of Canada
People from Kawartha Lakes
Activists from Montreal
Canadian women activists